FF8 may refer to:

Final Fantasy VIII, a 1999 role-playing game originally released on the PlayStation video game console
Fatal Fury: Wild Ambition, the eight installment of the Fatal Fury fighting game series, released in 1999
The Fate of the Furious, alternatively known as Fast & Furious 8, a 2017 action film
Firefox 8, a web browser